Zoltán Nagy (born 25 October 1985 in Debrecen) is a Hungarian football (defender) player who currently plays for Debreceni VSC.

References

HLSZ

1985 births
Living people
Sportspeople from Debrecen
Hungarian footballers
Association football defenders
Baktalórántháza VSE footballers
Létavértes SC players
Debreceni VSC players
Budapest Honvéd FC players
Nyíregyháza Spartacus FC players
Nemzeti Bajnokság I players